Sicyopus is a genus of small gobies. Most are native to fast-flowing streams and rivers in Southeast Asia and Melanesia, but S. zosterophorus also occurs in China, Japan and Palau, S. nigriradiatus is restricted to Pohnpei, S. jonklaasi is restricted to Sri Lanka, and S. lord is restricted to Madagascar.

Species
There are currently 10 recognized species in this genus:
 Sicyopus auxilimentus Watson & Kottelat, 1994
 Sicyopus cebuensis I. S. Chen & K. T. Shao, 1998
 Sicyopus discordipinnis Watson, 1995
 Sicyopus exallisquamulus Watson & Kottelat, 2006
 Sicyopus jonklaasi H. R. Axelrod, 1972 (Lipstick goby)
 Sicyopus lord Keith, Marquet & Taillebois, 2011 (Lord's sicyopus)
 Sicyopus multisquamatus de Beaufort, 1912
 Sicyopus nigriradiatus Parenti & Maciolek, 1993
 Sicyopus rubicundus Keith, Hadiaty, Busson & Hubert, 2014 
 Sicyopus zosterophorus Bleeker, 1856

References

 
Sicydiinae
Taxa named by Theodore Gill
Taxonomy articles created by Polbot